Aloïse Moudileno-Massengo (March 11, 1933 – January 6, 2020) was the first Congolese lawyer in France. He later became a minister in the Republic of the Congo under Alphonse Massamba-Débat and then Marien Ngouabi, as well as serving as Vice-President of the Republic of the Congo.

Biography

Family origin and training
Aloïse Moudileno-Massengo was born in 1933 in the Vindza (Vinza) district of N’Ko (N’koo) in the department of the Pool, the second child of a family of the Lari community.

In 1947, he attended the Kindamba primary school and then, in 1948, the little seminary of Mbamou where he either crossed paths with or followed in the wake of several young Congolese men who would later play important political roles: Lazare Matsocota, Emmanuel Ndébéka, and Emile Biayenda. After getting his BEPC in 1953, he attended (with Louis Sylvain-Goma) the lycée Augagneur de Pointe-Noire. In 1956 he received his Baccalaureate in Philosophy from the Academy of Bordeaux, which he prepared at the Savorgnan de Brazza lycée in Brazzaville (where he also met Pierre Nzé and André Milongo).    

Following his admittance into the higher education system in France, he did his preparatory courses at the Lycée Poincaré of Nancy, where he attended courses in the ENFOM, or École Nationale de la France d'Outre Mer. The passing of the Deferre Policy in 1956 shook up relations between France and its overseas territories, and the last class of student-administrators was accepted in 1956.

At this point, Moudileno-Massengo reoriented himself towards law. In the fall term of 1957, he enrolled in the University of Nancy law school. During the next five years he became close friends with Emmanuel Yoka and André Milongo and established strong ties with François Olassa, Édouard Ebouka-Babackas, Alexis Gabou, Jean-Martin M’Bemba and Pierre Moussa. In 1963 he received his law degree (certificate d’aptitude à la profession d’avocat or CAPA).

First Congolese lawyer (1964–1968)
Despite this academic accomplishment, the Nancy Bar Association rejected his request to integrate in a decision reached by the Council of the Order (Conseil de l’Ordre) on January 20, 1964, based on the conclusion that he was not a French national. Indeed, there were agreements passed between 1960 and 1961 by the French State and the majority of its ex-colonies that established institutional reciprocity. Nevertheless, French bar associations, notably those in the provinces, often held up or refused the admittance of African nationals. Moudileno-Massengo filed and subsequently won a suit against the Nancy bar; the decision was reached by the court of appeals and was recorded as precedent on March 4, 1964.

In 1964, at the age of 31, Moudileno-Massengo thus became the first Congolese lawyer participating in a French bar association as well as the first black member of the Nancy bar, where he would practice until 1966.

Moudileno-Massengo returned to the Congo at the end of 1966. There, on January 13, 1967,  Moudileno-Massengo was named defense attorney in the Appeals Court of Brazzaville (alongside Martin) by a decree of the Garde des Sceaux (Keeper of the Seals) and the Minister of Justice, thereby becoming the first lawyer integrated into the Brazzaville bar association.

Continuing the militant activity initiated in the Association des Étudiants Congolais (Association of Congolese Students), he remained in constant communication with the new African elite opposed to neo-colonialism. Most notably, he was the editor in chief of the Étudiant Congolais (The Congolese Student), the journal of the Fédération des Étudiants d’Afrique Noire Francophone (FEANF; The Federation of Students of Francophone Black Africa). It is in this spirit that he attended as a lawyer the United Nations Conference on the Rights of Treaties in Vienna, Austria, from March to May 1968.

He left the Brazzaville bar in 1968 in order to enter the government.

In the government (1968–1972) 
In August 1968, Moudileno-Massengo was nominated for Garde des Sceaux (Keeper of the Seals), Minister of Justice and of Labor, by president Alphonse Massemba-Débat. At the age of 35, along with Ambroise Noumazalaye, Claude-Ernest Ndalla, Justin Lekoudzou and Pierre Nzé, he became part of the emerging young intelligentsia trained in French universities and shaped politically by the anti-colonialist circles of the Association des Étudiants Congolais in France (AEC) and the FEANF, whose rise within the party in power and the state apparatus contributed to the renewing of the ruling class. 

Captain Marien Ngouabi came to power at the beginning of September and, following the advice of Jacques Opangault (founder of the Mouvement Socialiste Africain—African Socialist Movement—affiliated with the SFIO), returned Moudileno-Massengo to his functions within the government on September 6, 1968.

As Minister of Justice, Moudileno-Massengo fought to ameliorate the conditions of prisoners and to preserve their dignity. In August 1968, he sent to all prison wardens a series of rules forbidding practices that would humiliate or debase those incarcerated. In the same humanistic spirit, he attempted to promote rehabilitation through education and began to set up reading spaces throughout the prison system.

He was maintained in his functions despite repeated ministerial reshuffling and he continued to advance in the hierarchical order of power. In the reorganization that took place on June 21, 1969, he became the third most important person in the government.

Throughout these years, the regime in power moved increasingly towards an orthodox Marxist-Leninism. In December of 1969, the Mouvement National de la Révolution (The National Movement of the Revolution) was replaced by the Parti Congolais du Travail (PCT; The Congolese Party of Labor). A new constitution was instituted that founded the République Populaire du Congo (The Popular Republic of the Congo). As Keeper of the Seals, Moudileno-Massengo oversaw the trial of the triple murder of the high-level functionaries Matsocota, Pouabou, and Massouémé, though who was responsible for the murders were never firmly established. 

The hardening of the Marxist tendencies of the government in 1970 and 1971 precipitated several uprisings (Pierre Kinganga, Bernard Koléla). This "counter-revolutionary" threat galvanized the left-wing of the party led by the senior Maoist leaders of the youth movement and the paramilitary militias, namely Ange Diawara, Ambroise Noumazalaye and Claude-Ernest Ndalla, who, in December 1971, attempted to marginalize Marien Ngouabi  into the minority during the special session of the Central Committee of the PCT, which convened following the student strikes of November 1971. The president neutralized the left's maneuver by allying himself with the right-wing of the party. The Political Bureau and the Council of State were reorganized with a rise in the power of Moudileno-Massengo who became the vice-president of the Board of State and vice-president of the Republic.

The marginalization of the left-wing of the party fed a growing tension within the party that, in turn, would lead to an attempted coup on February 22, 1972 (the so-called M 22 movement, led by Ange Diawara). With others designated to the right (Ekamba-Elombé, Pierre Nzé and H. Lopès), Moudileno-Massengo was arrested by the leaders of the coup and incarcerated at the Makala prison, only to be liberated by the destitutions of power and sentences. Nearly fifty capital sentences were declared by the military court. These were almost immediately commuted to life and then amnesty in the weeks that followed. 

As the second in command in the regime, Moudileno-Massengo led a number of diplomatic missions throughout Africa, Asia, and Europe. Most notably, he represented the PCT at the funeral of Ghanaian ex-president Kwame Nkrumah in Conakry in May 1972. Nevertheless, his political clout would diminish due to Ngouabi increasingly concentrating power into his own hands (as President of the Republic, President of the Central Committee of the PCT, Head of State, Head of the Government, President of the Council of State), to the return to favor of the left-wing of the party, to the increasing power of the military at the expense of the university-trained politicians, and to the progression of tribal politics.

Leader of the opposition in exile (1972–1991) 
In August 1972, during a mission to the German Democratic Republic, Moudileno-Massengo resigned his position. 

On August 12, 1972, Congolese radio presented him as having "abandoned his duties" and as being "on the run" in a foreign country. His widely disseminated letter of resignation addressed to Ngouabi on August 5, 1972, revealed the extent of their political differences. His decision was heavily criticized by his political rivals but also by his mentor, Jacques Opangault, who feared a breakdown of the fragile North-South relationship. Ange Edouard Pongui replaced him as vice-president and Alexandre Denguet replaced him as Garde des Sceaux and Minister of Labor.

Following a line that some have called "moderate Marxism," he organized and led the principal opposition movement outside the country to the regime of Joachim Yhombi-Opango (president from 1977 to 1979). Created in 1976, his FDRCO was then considered the largest opposition party in exile. 

In his 1978 book Procès de Brazzaville, le réquisitoire (Brazzaville Trial, The Endictment), he claimed that, at the request of the Party's Military Committee, the assassination of Ngouabi, who originally came from the Cuvette Region (the "basin") of Northwestern Congo, had been attributed to political leaders from the "Pool" region of Southeastern Congo, which led to their fast-tracked execution.

Along these same lines, from 1979 to 1991, Moudileno-Massengo remained an emblematic opposition leader to the regime of Denis Sassou-Nguesso through the Front Patriotique Congolais (Congolese Patriotic Front) created in 1983 with Dr. Ekondy-Akala and then through the Mouvement Patriotique Congolais (Congolese Patriotic Movement) or MPC, over which he presided. 

In 1985, the US commerce department recognized the MPC as the principal opposition party in exile. All the while, it also emphasized its relatively minimal impact because of Sassou-Nguesso’s ability to weaken the opposition and to control the armed forces. Sassou-Nguesso accomplished this by regularly hiring important members of the opposition into elevated posts in his government while maintaining members of his family originating in the village of Oyo or from the Cuvette region in key military and security positions.

Multi-party system, Sovereign National Conference
In 1990, Moudileno-Massengo published a document entitled "Call to the Nation" that was subsequently signed by the principal opposition parties both within the country and in exile, most notably B. Koléla, A. Hombessa, J. Nkouka, and Ekondi-Akala. Among the 84 other parties and political associations, he took part in the Sovereign National Conference established in February of 1991 in his capacity as leader of the MPC (with Dr. Ekondi-Akala). According to some, he appeared at that moment as one of the most credible potential successors to Sassou-Nguesso. Moudileno-Massengo was instead part of the delegation that supported André Milongo (who was designated as the transitional prime minister in June 1991) to the presidency in 1992. 

In April 1992, Moudileno-Massengo was named First Deputy Director General to Elf-Congo at the demand of the Congolese State, one of the company’s shareholders. This nomination occurred in the context of the recalibration of the Congo and the oil companies that had been demanded by the National Conference. To that point, the management of the country's oil resources followed arrangements considered by some to be highly unbalanced. These previous arrangements had been "little scrutinized by the Adjunct Directors who to this point had been complacently nominated to the position by the Congolese state." After having successfully renegotiated the part of oil revenues that would be returned to the Congolese state, President Pascal Lissouba, who faced ever-increasing budgetary problems, ceded a significant portion of future revenue, and finally, at the end of 1994, gave to Elf-Congo the entire 25% that the Congolese state held, thereby eliminating the position of First Deputy Director General occupied by Moudileno-Massengo. 

On January 22, 1993, approximately fifteen political parties, including the Mouvement Patriotique Congolais, signed the founding document of the Centre Démocratique (Democratic Center). Led by Moudileno-Massengo, this party proposed a massive reform of the financing of political parties in order to reduce corruption to minimize the recruitment done by political leaders within their close family circle. The proposal was rejected by the party in power.

Civil War, exile in France
From 1994 onward, the power of the various political parties was increasingly determined by military strength that was in turn undergirded by foreign forces or by ethnically defined militias. Because it refused to adhere to tribalistic or militaristic principles, the Mouvement Patriotique Congolais was slowly marginalized. Matondo, in fact, used the example of Moudileno-Massengo to illustrate his point that in Congo, "unarmed political leaders are merely figureheads." The civil war of 1997 in Congo-Brazzaville ended with the military victory of Sassou-Nguesso and with Moudileno-Massengo returning to exile in France, where he lived since 1998.

Death
Moudileno-Massengo died on January 6, 2020, in Nancy, France.

Works
République populaire du Congo : une escroquerie idéologique ou Au cœur du long drame. 1, Les Faits, G. P. Maisonneuve et Larose, 1975.
Procès de Brazzaville, le réquisitoire, Paris, [5 février 1978], L’Harmattan, 1986.
Devant un observatoire à Paris : dimanche 18 novembre 2001, éditeur [Nancy] (5 rue Duc-Raoul, 54000), 2001
Ntoumi : l'alibi, le démenti, le défi, Nancy (5 rue Duc-Raoul, 54000), 2002.
Le temps du dialogue et de la reconstruction: Congo-Brazzaville, Nancy (5 rue Duc-Raoul, 54000), 2002

2020 deaths
20th-century French lawyers
Vice presidents of the Republic of the Congo
1933 births